Harpullia leichhardtii is a tree in the family Sapindaceae, endemic to the Northern Territory.

Description 
Harpullia leichhardtii is a tree which grows up to 8 m high. The shoots and the stalks of the inflorescences are covered with short, weak, soft hairs, but otherwise the tree is glabrous. The rachis of the compound leaf is 5–17.5 cm long, and there are four to eight leaflets, which are ovate/elliptic, smooth-edged and  5.5–18 cm by 2.5–8 cm. Inflorescences are axillary, and up to 11 cm long, with the stalk of each flower being 6–10 mm long. The sepals are elliptic, 6–7 mm long, and covered with dense intertwined hairs. Petals are 7.5 mm long and there are five stamens. The ovary is velvety and the style is short. There is one seed in each locule, which is nearly covered by the aril.

The leaves are very like those of Harpullia pendula, but in H. leichhardtii the sepals persist in the fruit and the seeds have well developed arils.

Taxonomy
Harpullia leichhardtii was first described by George Bentham in 1863, from a specimen collected  at Port Essington (Darwin) by Ludwig Leichhardt whom the specific epithet, leichhardtii, honours. An isotype, M-0225480, is held at M, the Munich Herbarium, and a holotype, MEL-71610, is held at MEL, the National Herbarium of Victoria, both specimens collected by Leichhardt at "Entrance Island", Port Essington.

References

leichhardtii
Flora of the Northern Territory
Taxa named by George Bentham
Plants described in 1863